The second cabinet of Jóannes Eidesgaard was the government of the Faroe Islands from 4 February until 26 September 2008. It was a coalition between Social Democratic Party (SDP) (with Jóannes Eidesgaard as Prime Minister), Republic (R), Centre Party (CP).

There were internal disagreements after a few months, especially about some offices in Tinganes (later referred to as Lásagølan which means The lock scandal, something about changing of the lock of an office in the governmental administration), which resulted in Republic leaving the coalition on 15 September 2008, which created a government crisis. This made space for Kaj Leo Johannesen's First Cabinet on 26 September.

See also 
Cabinet of the Faroe Islands

References 

Cabinets of the Faroe Islands
2008 in the Faroe Islands